The Devil Within (also known as The Devil Within: Rise of Evil) is a 2010 independent feature film directed by Tom Hardy and written by Matt Dean. The film follows 18 year-old Sirena's high school birthday pool party, which soon turns bloody as an unexpected guest begins murdering the teens one at a time. It received decent reviews from fans and the horror community.

Cast

References

External links
 

2010 films
American teen horror films
2010 horror films
2010 independent films
American independent films
Films set in Los Angeles
American horror thriller films
2010 horror thriller films
2010s English-language films
2010s American films